The State of Israel has engaged in state-sponsored terrorism, and has been accused of committing acts of state terrorism on a daily basis in the Palestinian Occupied Territories. Countries that have condemned Israel's role as a perpetrator of state-sponsored terrorism or state terrorism include Bolivia, Iran, Lebanon, Saudi Arabia, Syria, Turkey, and Yemen.

An early example of Israeli state-sponsored was the 1954 Lavon Affair, a botched bomb plot in Egypt that led to the resignation of the Israeli defense minister at the time. In the 1970s and 1980s, Israel was also a major supplier of arms to dictatorial regimes in South America, Sub-Saharan Africa, and Asia. In the 21st-century, it has been accused of sponsoring and supporting several terrorist groups as part of its proxy conflict with Iran.

1950–51 Baghdad bombings

1950–1951 Baghdad bombings refers to a series of bombings of Jewish targets in Baghdad, Iraq, between April 1950 and June 1951. There is a dispute around the true identity and objective of the offenders behind the bombings, and this issue remains unresolved.

Two activists in the Iraqi Zionist underground were found guilty by an Iraqi court for a number of the bombings, and were sentenced to death. Another was sentenced to life imprisonment and seventeen more were given long prison sentences. The allegations against Israeli agents had "wide consensus" amongst Iraqi Jews in Israel.  Many of the Iraqi Jews in Israel who lived in poor conditions blamed their ills and misfortunes on the Israeli Zionist emissaries or Iraqi Zionist underground movement. The theory that "certain Jews" carried out the attacks "in order to focus the attention of the Israel Government on the plight of the Jews" was viewed as "more plausible than most" by the British Foreign Office. Telegrams between the Mossad agents in Baghdad and their superiors in Tel Aviv give the impression that neither group knew who was responsible for the attack.
Israel has consistently denied involvement in the bombings.

1954 Lavon Affair

The 'Lavon Affair' was an unsuccessful Israeli covert operation, code named 'Operation Susannah', conducted in Egypt in the Summer of 1954. As part of the false flag operation, a group of Egyptian Jews were recruited by Israeli military intelligence to plant bombs inside Egyptian, American and British-owned civilian targets, cinemas, libraries and American educational centers. The attacks were to be blamed on the Muslim Brotherhood, Egyptian Communists, "unspecified malcontents" or "local nationalists" with the aim of creating a climate of sufficient violence and instability to induce the British government to maintain its occupying troops in Egypt's Suez Canal zone. The explosions were timed to happen several hours after closing time, and did not cause any fatalities. However, an operative died when a bomb he was taking to a movie theater ignited prematurely in his pocket. In addition, two operatives committed suicide after being captured and two more operatives who were tried, convicted and executed by Egypt.

The operation ultimately became known as the 'Lavon Affair'. Following this operation the Israeli defense minister Pinhas Lavon was forced to resign. Even though Israel denied any involvement in the operation for 51 years, the surviving members were honored by Israeli President Moshe Katzav in 2005. The operation is cited as a case study in critical terrorism studies.

1970s–1980s military support to dictatorships

Since the 1970s, Israel has provided military support to a range of dictatorial regimes in South America, Sub-Saharan Africa, and Asia. Penny Lernoux called it a "Who's Who" of dictators. Between 1970 and 1980, Israel accounted for 80% of military imports in El Salvador leading up to the Salvadoran Civil War. Israel also provided 100 advisors, pilots for combat missions, and a computer system to monitor resistance activity in the country. In Guatemala, Israel was the sole arms supplier during the terror that followed the election of General Lucas García in 1978, events that included the Panzós massacre. In Indonesia, as reported by Noam Chomsky, Israel served as a proxy for the United States, providing aircraft used to massacre the Timorese in the late 1970s.

Front for the Liberation of Lebanon from Foreigners 

After the 1979 massacre of an Israeli family at Nahariya by Palestine Liberation Front militants, Israel Defense Forces Chief of Staff Rafael Eitan instructed Israeli General Avigdor Ben-Gal to "Kill them all," meaning the Palestinian Liberation Organization and those connected to it. With Eitan's approval, Ben-Gal charged Meir Dagan with running the operations. The operations, approved by the Chief of Staff, were kept secret from the IDF's General Staff and many other members of the Israeli government. David Agmon, at the time head of Israel's northern command, was one of the few people who was briefed on its operations. Lebanese operatives on the ground from the Maronite, Shiite and Druze communities were recruited. The aim of the series of operations was to "cause chaos among the Palestinians and Syrians in Lebanon, without leaving an Israeli fingerprint, to give them the feeling that they were constantly under attack and to instill them with a sense of insecurity."

Beginning in July 1981, with a bomb attack on the Palestine Liberation Organization (PLO) offices at Fakhani Road in West Beirut, these attacks were claimed by a group called the Front for the Liberation of Lebanon from Foreigners. The FLLF was itself a front for Israeli agents, and it killed hundreds of people between 1979 and 1983.

By September 1981, the Front's operations consisted of car bombs exploding regularly in the Palestinian neighborhoods of Beirut and other Lebanese cities. Particularly deadly attacks include an October 1, 1981 attack in Beirut that killed 83 and a November 29, 1981 attack in Aleppo that killed 90. FLLF operations came to a sudden halt just prior to the June 1982 Israeli invasion of Lebanon, only to be resumed the following year: first a 28 January 1983 strike on a PLO headquarters at Chtaura in the Syrian-controlled Beqaa Valley, killing 35, coupled by a second on 3 February at West Beirut that devastated the Palestine Research Center offices and left 20 people dead, including the wife of Sabri Jiryis.  A third bombing occurred on Syrian-controlled Baalbek on 7 August 1983, which killed about 30 people and injured nearly 40, followed by another on 5 December 1983 at the Chyah quarter of the Southern suburbs of Beirut that claimed the lives of 12 people and maimed over 80.

The FLLF disbanded after 1983.

Proxies against Iran

Israel and Iran are belligerent enemies. Though they have never been at war, both nations make efforts to undermine the other's influence in the region through various means: diplomatic, economic, and military. This includes the use of (often armed) proxies, which facilitate indirect conflict between the powers, and in the case of Iranian proxies Hamas and Hezbollah, outright war. The Israeli government supports various armed groups in its conflict with Iranian government.

Four Iranian nuclear scientists—Masoud Alimohammadi, Majid Shahriari, Darioush Rezaeinejad and Mostafa Ahmadi Roshan—were assassinated between 2010 and 2012. Another scientist, Fereydoon Abbasi, was wounded in an attempted murder. Two of the killings were carried out with magnetic bombs attached to the targets' cars; Darioush Rezaeinejad was shot dead, and Masoud Alimohammadi was killed in a motorcycle-bomb explosion. At the time, unnamed US officials confirmed to NBC that the People's Mujahedin of Iran (MEK) had been financed, trained, and armed by Israel as part of the killing of the Iranian nuclear scientists. The revelation sparked a debate among American commentators, including Richard Engel and Robert Windrem, on whether the partnership made Israel culpable as a state sponsor of terrorism given the then Foreign Terrorist Organization-designation of the MEK.

On 27 November 2020, the Israeli government, with knowledge and support from the US government, assassinated Fakhrizadeh in a road ambush in Absard using an innovative autonomous satellite-operated gun.

According to a 2012 report in Foreign Policy, Mossad agents disguised as Central Intelligence Agency (CIA) officers also recruited members of Jundallah—"a Pakistan-based Sunni terrorist organization ... responsible for assassinating Iranian government officials and killing Iranian women and children"—to carry out "false flag" operations against Iran, straining Israel's relations with the United States.

Syrian Civil War 
Israel provides medical assistance to wounded Syrian rebels crossing the border of "the Israeli-controlled Golan Heights"; most of this assistance has gone to Al-Nusra Front (now Tahrir al-Sham). Aymenn Jawad Al-Tamimi notes that "this[,] however[,] does not prove that it is a matter of Israeli policy to provide treatment for Hay'at Tahrir al-Sham members." Israeli officials stated that they provide humanitarian aid to wounded combatants and civilians regardless of their identity. According to a March 2015 report in The Wall Street Journal, two-thirds of "the Syrians treated in Israel" were military-age men. One UNDOF report stated that two boxes of unspecified content were transferred from Israel to Syrian rebels and that the soldiers of IDF met with Syrian rebels in the east of the border. Israel is believed to share intelligence with the rebels. "Former head of Israel's military intelligence Amos Yadlin explained Israel's rationale: "There is no doubt that Hezbollah and Iran are the major threat to Israel, much more than the radical Sunni Islamists, who are also an enemy."

IDF Chief of Staff Gadi Eisenkot has acknowledged that Israel has provided weapons to rebel groups in Syria.

See also

 Iran–Saudi Arabia proxy conflict
 Iran and state-sponsored terrorism
 Pakistan and state-sponsored terrorism
 Qatar and state-sponsored terrorism
 Terrorism and the Soviet Union
 United States and state-sponsored terrorism
 Zionist political violence
 Assassination of Iranian nuclear scientists

References

Citations

Sources

terrorisml
Israel
Terrorism in Israel
Zionist terrorism
Iran–Israel proxy conflict